FabHotels is a network of 3 star budget hotels in India, having its headquarters in Gurugram. As of November 2022 it operates in more than 66 cities of India with 900+ Hotels, including major cities like Mumbai, New Delhi, Chennai, Bangalore, Kolkata,
Hyderabad, Visakhapatnam and Coimbatore. Its operations began in 2014.

History 
FabHotels was founded in 2014 by Vaibhav Aggarwal, an alumnus of IIT Guwahati and Wharton School of the University of Pennsylvania and Adarsh Manpuria, also an alumnus of The Wharton School of the University of Pennsylvania.

Funding 
In 2016, FabHotels raised a funding of $8 million from Accel Partners, RB Investments, Mohandas Pai’s Aarin Capital and Qualcomm Ventures.

In 2017, FabHotels received a funding of $25 million in a Series B funding from Goldman Sachs. Accel Partners also participated in this round.

See also 
 List of chained-brand hotels
 OYO Rooms

References

External links 
 

Hotel affiliation groups
Hotel chains in India
Indian companies established in 2014
Hotels established in 2014
2014 establishments in Haryana
Companies based in Gurgaon